Gold Is Not All is a 1913 Canadian short drama silent black and white film directed by Wilfred Lucas and produced by Carl Laemmle.

Cast
 King Baggot as Karl - the Composer
 Jane Gail as The Girl
 Bess Meredyth as The Slavey
 William Cavanaugh as The Miser Uncle
 Frank Russell as The Director
 William Cowper as The Artist
 William R. Dunn as Mr. Rich
 Harry Fisher as The Writer

References

External links
 

Canadian silent short films
1913 short films
1913 drama films
1913 films
Canadian black-and-white films
Films directed by Wilfred Lucas
Films produced by Carl Laemmle
Independent Moving Pictures films
Universal Pictures short films
Canadian drama short films
1910s Canadian films
Silent drama films